This is a list of the county governors (Fylkesmenn) of Vestfold, Norway.

References

Vestfold